Trutnev is a Russian masculine surname, its feminine counterpart is Trutneva. It may refer to
Ivan Trutnev (1827–1912), was a Russian painter
Yury Trutnev (born 1956), Russian politician
 Yuri Trutnev (scientist) (1927–2021), Russian physicist

Russian-language surnames